Flexiseps ardouini, also known commonly as the yellow skink, is a species of lizard in the family Scincidae. The species is endemic to Madagascar.

Etymology
The specific name, ardouini, is in honor of French plant collector Léon Ardouin (1841–1909).

Geographic range
F. ardouini is found in northwestern Madagascar.

Habitat
The preferred natural habitat of F. ardouini is dry forest.

Reproduction
The mode of reproduction of F. ardouini is unknown.

References

Further reading
Brygoo É-R (1983). "Systématique des lézards scincides de la région malgache. X. Rapports de Gongylus johannae Günther 1880, des Comores, et de Sepsina valhallae Boulenger 1909, des Glorieuses, avec les espèces malgaches ". Bulletin du Muséum national d'Histoire naturelle, Série quatrième [Fourth Series] 5 (2): 651–660. (Amphiglossus ardouini, new combination, p. 657). (in French).
Erens J, Miralles A, Glaw F, Chatrou LW, Vences M (2017). "Extended molecular phylogenetics and revised systematics of Malagasy scincine lizards". Molecular Phylogenetics and Evolution 107: 466–472. (Flexiseps ardouini, new combination).
Glaw F, Vences M (2006). A Field Guide to the Amphibians and Reptiles of Madagascar, Third Edition. Cologne, Germany: Vences & Glaw Verlag. 496 pp. . (Amphiglossus ardouini).
Mocquard F (1897). "Notes herpétologiques ". Bulletin du Muséum national d'Histoire naturelle [First Series] 3 (6): 211–217. (Sepsina ardouini, new species, pp. 211–213). (in French).

Reptiles of Madagascar
Reptiles described in 1897
Flexiseps
Taxa named by François Mocquard
Taxobox binomials not recognized by IUCN